In mathematics, the total variation identifies several slightly different concepts, related to the (local or global) structure of the codomain of a function or a measure. For a real-valued continuous function f, defined on an interval [a, b] ⊂ R, its total variation on the interval of definition is a measure of the one-dimensional arclength of the curve with parametric equation x ↦ f(x), for x ∈ [a, b]. Functions whose total variation is finite are called functions of bounded variation.

Historical note
The concept of total variation for functions of one real variable was first introduced by Camille Jordan in the paper . He used the new concept in order to prove a convergence theorem for Fourier series of discontinuous periodic functions whose variation is bounded. The extension of the concept to functions of more than one variable however is not simple for various reasons.

Definitions

Total variation for functions of one real variable
 The total variation of a real-valued (or more generally complex-valued) function , defined on an interval  is the quantity

where the supremum runs over the set of all partitions  of the given interval.

Total variation for functions of n > 1 real variables 

 Let Ω be an open subset of Rn. Given a function f belonging to L1(Ω), the total variation of f in Ω is defined as

where  
  is the essential supremum norm, and 
  is the divergence operator. 
This definition does not require that the domain  of the given function be a bounded set.

Total variation in measure theory

Classical total variation definition

clearly

 The variation (also called absolute variation) of the signed measure  is the set function

and its total variation is defined as the value of this measure on the whole space of definition, i.e.

Modern definition of total variation norm
 uses upper and lower variations to prove the Hahn–Jordan decomposition: according to his version of this theorem, the upper and lower variation are respectively a non-negative and a non-positive measure. Using a more modern notation, define

The last measure is sometimes called, by abuse of notation, total variation measure.

Total variation norm of complex measures
If the measure  is complex-valued i.e. is a complex measure, its upper and lower variation cannot be defined and the Hahn–Jordan decomposition theorem can only be applied to its real and imaginary parts. However, it is possible to follow  and define the total variation of the complex-valued measure  as follows

 The variation of the complex-valued measure  is the set function

where the supremum is taken over all partitions  of a measurable set  into a countable number of disjoint measurable subsets.

This definition coincides with the above definition  for the case of real-valued signed measures.

Total variation norm of vector-valued measures

The variation so defined is a positive measure (see ) and coincides with the one defined by  when  is a signed measure: its total variation is defined as above. This definition works also if  is a vector measure: the variation is then defined by the following formula

where the supremum is as above. This definition is slightly more general than the one given by  since it requires only to consider finite partitions of the space : this implies that it can be used also to define the total variation on finite-additive measures.

Total variation of probability measures

The total variation of any probability measure is exactly one, therefore it is not interesting as a means of investigating the properties of such measures. However, when μ and ν are probability measures, the total variation distance of probability measures can be defined as  where the norm is the total variation norm of signed measures.  Using the property that , we eventually arrive at the equivalent definition

and its values are non-trivial. Informally, this is the largest possible difference between the probabilities that the two probability distributions can assign to the same event. For a categorical distribution it is possible to write the total variation distance as follows

Basic properties

Total variation of differentiable functions

The form of the total variation of a differentiable function of one variable
 The total variation of a differentiable function , defined on an interval , has the following expression if  is Riemann integrable

If  is differentiable and monotonic, then the above simplifies to

The form of the total variation of a differentiable function of several variables

 .

Proof
The first step in the proof is to first prove an equality which follows from the Gauss–Ostrogradsky theorem.

Lemma
Under the conditions of the theorem, the following equality holds:

Proof of the lemma
From the Gauss–Ostrogradsky theorem:
 
by substituting , we have:

Proof of the equality
Under the conditions of the theorem, from the lemma we have:

in the last part  could be omitted, because by definition its essential supremum is at most one.

Now again substituting into the lemma:

Q.E.D.

It can be seen from the proof that the supremum is attained when
 

The function  is said to be of bounded variation precisely if its total variation is finite.

Total variation of a measure
The total variation is a norm defined on the space of measures of bounded variation.  The space of measures on a σ-algebra of sets is a Banach space, called the ca space, relative to this norm.  It is contained in the larger Banach space, called the ba space, consisting of finitely additive (as opposed to countably additive) measures, also with the same norm. The distance function associated to the norm gives rise to the total variation distance between two measures μ and ν.

For finite measures on R, the link between the total variation of a measure μ and the total variation of a function, as described above, goes as follows. Given μ, define a function  by

Then, the total variation of the signed measure μ is equal to the total variation, in the above sense, of the function . In general, the total variation of a signed measure can be defined using Jordan's decomposition theorem by

for any signed measure μ on a measurable space .

Applications 
Total variation can be seen as a non-negative real-valued functional defined on the space of real-valued functions (for the case of functions of one variable) or on the space of integrable functions (for the case of functions of several variables). As a functional, total variation finds applications in several branches of mathematics and engineering, like optimal control, numerical analysis, and calculus of variations, where the solution to a certain problem has to minimize its value. As an example, use of the total variation functional is common in the following two kind of problems

 Numerical analysis of differential equations: it is the science of finding approximate solutions to differential equations. Applications of total variation to these problems are detailed in the article "total variation diminishing"
 Image denoising: in image processing, denoising is a collection of methods used to reduce the noise in an image reconstructed from data obtained by electronic means, for example data transmission or sensing.

See also 
 Bounded variation
 p-variation
 Total variation diminishing
 Total variation denoising
 Quadratic variation
 Total variation distance of probability measures
 Kolmogorov–Smirnov test
 Anisotropic diffusion

Notes

Historical references
.
.
.
.
.
.
.

 (available at Gallica). This is, according to Boris Golubov, the first paper on functions of bounded variation.
.
 . The paper containing the first proof of Vitali covering theorem.

References
.
. Available at Numdam.

.
. (available at the Polish Virtual Library of Science). English translation from the original French by Laurence Chisholm Young, with two additional notes by Stefan Banach.
.

External links 

One variable
 "Total variation" on PlanetMath.

One and more variables
Function of bounded variation at Encyclopedia of Mathematics

Measure theory
.
.
Jordan decomposition at Encyclopedia of Mathematics

Applications 
 (a work dealing with total variation application in denoising problems for image processing).

.

.

Tony F. Chan and Jackie (Jianhong) Shen (2005), Image Processing and Analysis - Variational, PDE, Wavelet, and Stochastic Methods, SIAM,  (with in-depth coverage and extensive applications of Total Variations in modern image processing, as started by Rudin, Osher, and Fatemi).

Mathematical analysis